Ronji is a minor Austronesian language of northern Papua New Guinea.

Locations
Ronji is spoken in two villages, one in Morobe Province and one in Madang Province:

Roinji village, Wasu Rural LLG, Morobe Province
Gali village, Bonga ward, Rai Coast Rural LLG, Madang Province

References

Ngero–Vitiaz languages
Languages of Madang Province
Languages of Morobe Province